Pierre Garcia  (27 July 1943 – 13 February 2023) was a French football player and manager. He played for Rennes in the French Ligue 1. Garcia died on 13 February 2023, at the age of 79.

Honours
Rennes
 Coupe de France: 1970–71

References

External links
 France - Trainers of First and Second Division Clubs

1943 births
2023 deaths
Pieds-Noirs
People from Blida Province
French footballers
Association football midfielders
Ligue 1 players
Stade Briochin players
Stade Rennais F.C. players
French football managers
Stade Rennais F.C. managers
Angers SCO managers
FC Rouen managers
Gazélec Ajaccio managers
Stade Brestois 29 managers
US Créteil-Lusitanos managers